This is a list of microfinance banks

A
 :Advans

B
 :Bandhan Bank
 BRAC

E
 :ESAF Small Finance Bank

F
 FINCA
 :First MicroFinance Bank-Afghanistan
 :First MicroFinance Bank-Pakistan
 :First MicroFinance Bank-Tajikistan

G
 :Grameen Bank

K
 :Khushhali Bank

N
 :NRSP Microfinance Bank
 :National Bank for Agriculture and Rural Development

T
 :Telenor Bank

Microfinance banks
Microfinance